The 1962 Australian GT Championship was a CAMS sanctioned motor racing title for drivers of Appendix K GT cars. The title, which was the third Australian GT Championship, was contested over a single race held at the Lakeside circuit, in Queensland, Australia on 8 July 1962.

The championship was won by John French driving a Centaur Waggott.

Results

Race statistics
 Pole position: John French (Centaur Waggott), 1m 15.6s
 Race distance: 50 laps, 75 mile (120 km) 
 Number of starters: 14
 Number of finishers: Not yet ascertained
 Race time of winning car: 62m 03.6s
 Fastest lap: John French, 1m 12.3s

References

External links
 Image of the Centaur Waggott in action

Australian GT Championship
GT Championship